Farmer Veteran Coalition (FVC) is a national nonprofit non-governmental organization in the United States that mobilizes veterans to feed America and transition from military service to a career in agriculture. The Farmer Veteran Coalition is based in Davis, California  and was founded by Michael O’Gorman so that veterans might serve their country in a new capacity, as providers of the nation's food and fiber. Jon Turner founded the Vermont chapter of the Farmer Veteran Coalition. Vermont veterans who have served in Iraq and Afghanistan since 9/11, are finding healing through farming thanks to the Farmer Veteran Coalition. The Farmer Veteran Coalition has given out more than $2.5 million in grants to veterans through the Farmer Veteran Fellowship Fund.  Their combined sales total $50 million.

Partners 
 Bob Woodruff Foundation
 Newman's Own Foundation
 Prairie Grove Farms
 Farm Credit Council
 Prudential Financial
 Kubota Corporation
 GreenStone Farm Credit Services

References 

Non-profit organizations based in California
Organizations established in 2008
2008 establishments in California